Makari may refer to:

Places
 Makari, Cameroon, a town on Lake Chad
 Makari, Guyana, a community in Potaro-Siparuni, Guyana
 Makari Gbanti, a chiefdom of Bombali District in Sierra Leone 
 Makari, Bombali, a village in Bombali District, northern Sierra Leone
 Makari, Tonkolili, a village in Tonkolili District, northern Sierra Leone

People
 Abdel Messih El-Makari (born 1892), Coptic Orthodox monk and priest, and a Coptic saint
 Farid Makari (born 1947), Lebanese politician, former Vice-President of Parliament
 George Makari (born 1960), historian, psychiatrist, and psychoanalyst
 Makari (Metropolitan of Ethiopia), Metropolitan of Ethiopia (1808-1810); see List of 19th-century religious leaders

Music
 Makari is an American rock band from Orlando, Florida.

See also
 Makary (disambiguation)
 Makati, a town in the Philippines
 Makira, an island in the Solomon Islands